Doberschütz is a municipality in the district of Nordsachsen, in Saxony, Germany. It has an area of 79,81 km² and a population of 4,082 (as of December 31, 2020).

References 

Nordsachsen